Two-level game theory is a political model of international conflict resolution between states derived from game theory and originally introduced in 1988 by Robert Putnam.

Putnam had been involved in research around the G7 summits between 1976 and 1979. However, at the fourth summit, held in Bonn in 1978, he observed a qualitative shift in how the negotiations worked.

The model views international negotiations between states as consisting of simultaneous negotiations at both the intranational level (domestic) and the international level (between governments). Over domestic negotiations, the chief negotiator absorbs the concern of societal actors and builds coalitions with them; at the international level, the chief negotiator seeks an agreement that is amongst the possible "wins" in his state's "win-set". Win-sets are the possible outcomes that are likely to be accepted by the domestic interest groups who either must ratify the agreement or provide some other form of government backing. International agreements occur when there is an overlap between the win-sets of the states involved in the international negotiations.

References

Bibliography

Further reading

 
 

Dispute resolution
Game theory
International relations
Negotiation